SableCC is an open-source compiler generator (or interpreter generator) in Java. Stable version is licensed under the GNU Lesser General Public License (LGPL). Rewritten version 4 is licensed under Apache License 2.0.

SableCC includes the following features:
Deterministic finite automaton (DFA)-based lexers with full Unicode support and lexical states.
Extended Backus–Naur form grammar syntax. (Supports the *, ? and + operators).
LALR(1) based parsers.
Automatic generation of strictly-typed abstract syntax trees.
Automatic generation of tree-walker classes.

See also

ANTLR
JavaCC
Coco/R

References

External links
SableCC website

Parser generators
Java development tools